Nine Days Wonder may refer to:
William Kempe's "Nine Days Wonder" in 1600, in which he morris danced from London to Norwich
"The Nine Days Wonder", 1975 episode of the period drama Upstairs, Downstairs
A Nine Days' Wonder, 1875 play by Charles Hamilton Aide
"A Nine Days' Wonder", 2005 Japanese pop song by Akeboshi
 "A Nine Days Wonder", song by Theatre of Tragedy from their 2009 album Forever Is The World